Betsy Warland (born 1946) is a Canadian feminist writer, and the author of a dozen books of poetry, creative nonfiction, and lyric prose. She is most widely known for her collection of essays, Breathing the Page: Reading the Act of Writing (2010).

Life 
Warland was born in Fort Dodge, Iowa, in 1946. She studied at Luther College in Decorah, Iowa, before immigrating to Canada in 1972. She became a significant figure in Canada's feminist writing scene after taking prominent roles in various literary events and organizations. She started the Toronto Women's Writing Collective (1973–1981), which hosted numerous events, including co-hosting (with the Toronto Women's Bookstore) Writers in Dialogue, featuring Adrienne Rich, Nicole Brossard, May Sarton, Audrey Thomas, Margaret Atwood, and Marge Piercy. She initiated and co-organized (with Victoria Freeman) the Women and Words/Les Femmes et les mots conference at the University of British Columbia (UBC) in 1983, which brought together, for the first and only time, 1,000 women working in all aspects of literature from across the country, and which was documented by the publication of the proceedings and of an anthology.

From 1986 to 1987 Warland was the executive director of the Federation of BC Writers, and she initiated Spring Rites, the annual competition for BC Writers. Warland also sat on the Special Council Committee of the Arts for the Vancouver City Council. She co-founded the Creative Nonfiction Collective with Myrna Kostash in 2004 and served on its board. She also served on the National Council of the Writers' Union of Canada from 2009 to 2012.

Warland has worked with emerging writers for over 30 years as a teacher and editor. She has mentored writers such as Jónína Kirton. She designed the Writer's Studio program at Simon Fraser University in 2001 and served as its director until 2012, during which time she helped initiate the Thursdays Writing Collective in Vancouver's culturally rich but poverty-stricken Downtown Eastside. In 2007 she founded the Vancouver Manuscript Intensive program, for which she continues to serve as a director. Warland has led workshops in the UK at the Poetry School (London), the Poetry Library (London), and the Arvon Foundation (Devon) and in Canada at Sage Hill, Booming Ground (UBC), the Metchosin International School of the Arts, and Simon Fraser University, among others. Her focus on and support of writers of different cultures, races, countries of origin, educations, genders, and sexual identities has opened doors for numerous award-winning authors.

An annual book award honoring Warland, the VMI Betsy Warland Between Genres Award, was launched in 2021. Jordan Abel was the inaugural 2021 winner for his book, Nishga. In 2022, the winning book was Remnants, written by Céline Huyghebaert and translated by Aleshia Jensen.

Warland's personal documents, interviews, photographs, and manuscripts have been acquired by the literary archives at Library and Archives Canada.

Writing 
Much of Warland's literary output has been in the form of essays, memoirs, and poetry books relating to feminism, women's studies, and lesbian issues. Her work has appeared in Canadian and international journals and anthologies.

Warland's first poem appeared in an issue of Waves in 1976, and she published her first volume of poetry, A Gathering Instinct, in 1981. Her books Bloodroot: Tracing the Untelling of Motherloss (2000) and Breathing the Page: Reading the Act of Writing (2010) are among her most popular titles. A second edition of Breathing the Page: Reading the Act of Writing (2023) will include new craft essays by the author. In 2021, a second edition of Bloodroot: Tracing the Untelling of Motherloss was published with an extended essay by the author on the subject of craft. Her memoir, Oscar of Between: A Memoir of Identity and Ideas (2016), was one of two books chosen to launch the Caitlin Press imprint Dagger Editions, dedicated to books about and by queer women. Between 2012 and 2017 she curated a new online publishing template called Oscar's Salon, which featured excerpts from Oscar of Between combined with the work of guest writers, artists, and composers, as well as readers' comments.

Selected works 
 Breathing the Page: Reading the Act of Writing. Second Edition. forthcoming
 Bloodroot: Tracing the Untelling of Motherloss. Second edition. Inanna Publications/York University, 2022
 Lost Lagoon/Lost in Thought. Caitlin Press, 2020
Oscar of Between: A Memoir of Identity and Ideas. Caitlin Press, 2016
 Oscar's Salon, an interactive online salon of excerpts from Oscar of Between in concert with guest writers, artists, and featured readers. BetsyWarland.com, 2012–2017
 Breathing the Page: Reading the Act of Writing. Cormorant Books, 2010
 Only This Blue: A Long Poem with an Essay. The Mercury Press, 2005
 Bloodroot: Tracing the Untelling of Motherloss. Second Story Press, 2000
 What Holds Us Here. Buschek Books, 1998
 Two Women in a Birth (with Daphne Marlatt). Guernica Editions, 1994
 The Bat Had Blue Eyes. Women's Press, 1993
 InVersions: Writing by Dykes, Queers and Lesbians (editor). Press Gang, 1991
 Telling It: Women and Language across Cultures (co-editor with Daphne Marlatt, Lee Maracle, and Sky Lee). Press Gang, 1990
 Proper Deafinitions: Collected Theorograms. Press Gang, 1990
 serpent (w)rite: (a reader's gloss). Coach House, 1987
 Double Negative (with Daphne Marlatt). gynergy books/Ragweed Press, 1986
 open is broken. Longspoon Press, 1984
 A Gathering Instinct. Williams-Wallace, 1981

Awards 
 The Vancouver Mayor's Arts Award for Literary Arts, October 2016 
 Pandora's Literary Festival BC Writer Mentor Award, 2011

References

External links 
 Betsy Warland
 Archives of Betsy Warland (Betsy Warland fonds, R11827) are held at Library and Archives Canada

1946 births
Living people
20th-century Canadian poets
21st-century Canadian poets
American feminist writers
American women poets
Canadian feminist writers
Canadian women poets
Canadian women essayists
Lesbian feminists
Canadian lesbian writers
Luther College (Iowa) alumni
People from Fort Dodge, Iowa
Poets from Iowa
Canadian LGBT poets
American women essayists
20th-century Canadian women writers
21st-century Canadian women writers
20th-century American poets
20th-century American essayists
21st-century American essayists
Canadian women non-fiction writers
LGBT people from Iowa
20th-century Canadian essayists
21st-century Canadian essayists
20th-century American women writers
21st-century American women writers
21st-century Canadian LGBT people
American lesbian writers